Gerardo may refer to:

People

Given name
Gerardo is the Spanish, Portuguese and Italian form of the male given name Gerard.
 Gerardo Amarilla (born 1969), Uruguayan politician 
 Gerardo Bonilla (born 1975), Puerto Rican-born professional race car driver
 Gerardo Carrera Piñera (born 1987), Spanish professional footballer, usually simply Gerardo
 Gerardo Diego (1896–1987), Spanish poet
 Gerardo García León (born 1974), Spanish footballer
 Gerardo Greco (born 1966), Italian journalist
 Gerardo Herrero (born 1953), Spanish film director, screenwriter and producer
 Gerardo de León (1913–1981), Filipino actor and film director
 Gerardo Machado (1871–1939), President of Cuba
 Gerardo Martino (born 1962), retired Argentine footballer and current manager
 Gerardo Matos Rodríguez (1897–1948), Uruguayan musician, composer and journalist
 Gerardo Mejía (born 1965), Ecuadorian-born musician, known as Gerardo
 Gerardo Meléndez, Puerto Rico-born scientist
 Gerardo Miranda (born 1956), retired Spanish footballer, usually simply Gerardo
 Gerardo Parra (born 1987), Venezuelan professional baseball player
 Gerardo Roxas (1924–1982), Filipino senator
 Gerardo Sofovich (1937–2015), Argentine businessman
 Gerardo Torrado (born 1979), Mexican footballer
 Gerardo Lopez (born 2000), American composer

See also
Geraldo
Lalo (nickname)
Gerard

Spanish masculine given names